Pasarela may refer to:

"Pasarela" (Dalmata song), a song by Dalmata
"Pasarela" (Daddy Yankee song), a song by Daddy Yankee